During the 1996–97 English football season, Aston Villa F.C. competed in the FA Premier League.

There was no silverware this season for last season's League Cup winners, but Brian Little's competent Villa side achieved UEFA Cup qualification for the second season running, but this time via the UEFA Respect Fair Play ranking.

The autumn of the season saw the departure of veteran defender Paul McGrath to Derby County, while the injured Gary Charles was replaced at right-back by the Portuguese Fernando Nelson. The end of the season saw the arrival of Liverpool striker Stan Collymore for a club record fee of £7 million. Club record signing Sasa Curcic, who had been disappointing after his £4million arrival in the summer of 1996, was then sold to Crystal Palace for £1million.

Long-serving defender Paul McGrath left in the autumn to sign for Derby County after more than seven years at Villa Park. Another Villa defender, Phil King, who had been restricted to just three league appearances in as many years at the club, was transferred to Swindon Town. Striker Tommy Johnson, whose first team chances were becoming increasingly limited, was sold to Celtic. Franz Carr left after just over a year at Villa Park to join Reggiana of Italy. Defender Carl Tiler was sold to Sheffield United for £500,000 after just 18 months at the club, having played just 12 league games due to injury.

Dwight Yorke was Villa's top scorer for the second season running, with 17 goals in the Premier League and 20 in all competitions.

Final league table

Results summary

Results by matchday

Results
Aston Villa's score comes first

Legend

FA Premier League

FA Cup

League Cup

UEFA Cup

Players

First-team squad
Squad at end of season

Left club during season

Reserve squad
The following players made most of their appearances this season for the reserves, and did not appear for the first-team, or only appeared for the first-team in friendlies.

Youth squad
The following players spent most of the season playing for the youth team, and did not appear for the first team, but may have appeared for the reserve team.

Schoolboys
The following players were signed to Aston Villa as associated schoolboys, and did not appear for the youth or reserve teams this season.

Other players
The following players were signed to Aston Villa on unknown contractual terms, and did not appear for the youth or reserve teams this season.

Transfers

In

Out

Transfers in:  £12,700,000
Transfers out:  £3,050,000
Total spending:  £9,650,000

Notes

References

External links
Aston Villa official website
avfchistory.co.uk 1996–97 season

Aston Villa F.C. seasons
Aston Villa